Menza may refer to:
 Don Menza
 Nick Menza
 Menza (river), a river in Mongolia and Russia